IROC I was the inaugural International Race of Champions, which was held at two tracks over two weekends in 1973 and 1974. The first three races were held October 27 and 28, 1973 at Riverside International Raceway and the final race was held on the Daytona International Speedway road course on February 14, 1974. Champion Mark Donohue won $54000 and the championship, which was determined by prize money rather than points. The races were contested in Porsche Carrera RSR race cars. This was the only IROC to be contested entirely on road courses. Only the top 6 finishing drivers competed in all four races.

The roster of drivers and final points standings were as follows:

Race results

Riverside International Raceway, Race One

2- Mark Donohue
7- Bobby Unser
3- Peter Revson
4- George Follmer
6- Denis Hulme
8- A. J. Foyt
10- Richard Petty
12- Roger McCluskey
5- David Pearson
11- Gordon Johncock
9- Bobby Allison
1- Emerson Fittipaldi

Riverside International Raceway, Race Two

4- George Follmer
9- David Pearson
12- Emerson Fittipaldi
3- Peter Revson
6- A. J. Foyt
2- Bobby Unser
11- Bobby Allison
5- Denis Hulme
10- Gordon Johncock
7- Richard Petty
8- Roger McCluskey
1- Mark Donohue

Riverside International Raceway, Race Three

12- Mark Donohue
6- Bobby Unser
3- Emerson Fittipaldi
2- David Pearson
1- George Follmer
5- A. J. Foyt
4- Peter Revson
8- Denis Hulme
7- Bobby Allison
10- Richard Petty
9- Gordon Johncock
11- Roger McCluskey

Daytona International Speedway, Race Four

1- Mark Donohue
2- Peter Revson
5- Bobby Unser
3- David Pearson
4- George Follmer
6- A. J. Foyt

References

International Race of Champions
1974 in American motorsport
1973 in American motorsport